Chris Molyneux is a former professional rugby league footballer who played in the 1990s and 2000s.

Club career
Chris Molyneux played in 1999's Super League IV, 2000's Super League V, and 2001's Super League VI.

References

External links
Stanley Rangers ARLFC - Roll of Honour

Batley Bulldogs players
English rugby league players
Featherstone Rovers players
Huddersfield Giants players
Living people
Place of birth missing (living people)
Rugby league props
Sheffield Eagles (1984) players
Year of birth missing (living people)